Helgi Dagbjartur Áss Grétarsson  (born 18 February 1977) is an Icelandic chess grandmaster. He won the World Junior Chess Championship in 1994.

Chess career
Helgi played for the Icelandic national team in the Chess Olympiad in 1994, 1996, 1998 and 2002. He tied for first place with Carsten Høi, Erling Mortensen, Nikolaj Borge and Lars Schandorff at the Politiken Cup 1997 tournament in Copenhagen. In this event, he won the prize for the best Nordic junior. The following year, he competed in the FIDE World Chess Championship in Groningen. Helgi knocked out Miguel Illescas in the first round, then in round 2 he was eliminated from the competition after losing to Artur Yusupov. He won the Icelandic Open 2018, scoring 8½/10. He is the No. 12 ranked Icelandic player as of September 2020.

References

External links

Helgi Ass Gretarsson chess games at 365chess.com

1977 births
Living people
Chess grandmasters
Chess Olympiad competitors
Helgi Gretarsson
World Junior Chess Champions

Place of birth missing (living people)